SK Strakonice 1908 was a Czech football club located in Strakonice. Before the 2012–13 season, the club most recently competed in the third tier in the 2005–06 season.

From 2011, Strakonice was a farm team for Czech First League side SK Dynamo České Budějovice.

References

External links
 Club page at iDNES.cz 
 Club page at the Strakonice city website 

Association football clubs established in 1908
1908 establishments in Austria-Hungary
Association football clubs disestablished in 2014
Defunct football clubs in the Czech Republic
Strakonice District